Ian James Watt  (born 18 June 1950) is a retired Australian public servant, best known for his time as Secretary of the Department of the Prime Minister and Cabinet from September 2011 to November 2014.

Background and career
Watt was born in Victoria and raised in Reservoir in Melbourne's northern suburbs. He was educated at La Trobe University and joined the Australian Public Service in 1971 in the Victorian Division of the Post Master General's Department. He completed his honours degree at the University of Melbourne before commencing a cadetship with the Department of the Treasury in 1973. Watt completed his master's degree and Ph.D. at La Trobe University before returning to The Treasury in 1985.

He served as Minister (Economic) at the Embassy of Australia in Washington from 1991 to 1994. On his return to Australia, Watt was appointed First Assistant Secretary of the Economic Division, Department of the Prime Minister and Cabinet, from March 1994 to November 1996; and was Deputy Secretary of the Department of the Prime Minister and Cabinet (DPM&C) and Executive Coordinator of the Economic, Industry and Resources Policy Group until March 2001. During his time at DPM&C, Watt completed the Advanced Management Program at the Harvard Business School.

In March 2001, Watt accepted appointment as the Secretary of the Department of Communications, Information Technology and the Arts, until his appointment as Secretary of the Department of Finance and Administration in January 2002. Watt became the longest serving Finance Secretary in April 2009. In August 2009 he accepted appointment as the Secretary of the Department of Defence, until his appointment to the Department of the Prime Minister and Cabinet in September 2011. Watt resigned from the role in November 2014. His departure had been speculated since the Abbott Government took office in September 2013.

Watt is the former chair of the Organisation for Economic Co-operation and Development's (OECD's) Working Party of Senior Budget Officials. His appointments since resigning from the public service include directorships with the Grattan Institute and Citigroup Pty Limited.

During April 2016, Watt was appointed Chair of SMART Infrastructure Facility's Advisory Council.

Honours
Watt was appointed an Officer of the Order of Australia in 2008. In 2016 Watt was appointed a Companion of the Order.

References

References and further reading

External links

1950 births
Secretaries of the Australian Department of Defence
Secretaries of the Australian Department of Finance
Secretaries of the Department of the Prime Minister and Cabinet
Australian public servants
Living people
La Trobe University alumni
University of Melbourne alumni
Officers of the Order of Australia
Companions of the Order of Australia
Public servants from Melbourne
People from Reservoir, Victoria